Martin Sviták (born 14 February 1980) is a Czech football player.

Sviták started his football career at Baník Ostrava, but did not manage to become a first squad regular and moved to SFC Opava. He eventually played for several other Czech clubs before moving to German lower division side Torgelower SV Greif.

External links
 Profile at iDNES.cz
 Profile at Vysočina Jihlava website

1980 births
Living people
Czech footballers
Czech First League players
FC Baník Ostrava players
SFC Opava players
FK Mladá Boleslav players
1. FK Příbram players
FC Vysočina Jihlava players
People from Valašské Meziříčí
Torgelower FC Greif players
Association football midfielders
FC Oberlausitz Neugersdorf players
Sportspeople from the Zlín Region